The Stoned Guest is "the premiere recording of the Half-Act Opera by P. D. Q. Bach", the pseudonym used by Peter Schickele for parodic works. It was released on Vanguard Records in 1970. The title is a play on Dargomyzhsky's opera The Stone Guest.  The record is a pseudo-radio broadcast hosted by "Milton Host" (parodying Metropolitan Opera commentator Milton Cross) including an appearance by "Paul Henry Lung" (a play on Paul Henry Lang) as a contestant on the intermission game "Opera Whiz" hosted by Schickele.

Performers
 Entire fiasco under the supervision of Professor Peter Schickele
 The Orchestra of the University of Southern North Dakota at Hoople Heavy Opera Company under the direction of John Nelson
 Marlene Kleinman, mezzanine soprano (Donna Ribalda, a high-born lady of the lowlands)
 Lorna Haywood, off-coloratura (Carmen Ghia, a woman of ailing repute)
 John Ferrante, bargain counter tenor (Don Octave, an itinerant nobleman)
 Bernice, houndentenor (Dog)
 Will Jordan as Milton Host
 Bill Macy as Paul Henry Lung
 Amateur Musica Antiqua of Hoople

Track listing 
Introduction
Half-Act Opera: The Stoned Guest, S. 86 proof, Part One
Overture
Aria: "Let's face it — I'm lost"
Recitative: "Boy!"
Aria: "Now is the season"
Recitative: "Gesundheit!"
Duet: "Woe"
Recitative: "Hark!"
Aria: "Look at me"
Recitative: "That's the end"
Trio: "I'm sure I'd be"
Intermission Feature: Opera Whiz
Plot Synopsis
Half-Act Opera: The Stoned Guest, S. 86 proof, Completion 
Recitative: "I hate to interrupt"
Quartet: "Don Octave"
Finale: "O saviour"
Announcement
Two Madrigals from The Triumphs of Thusnelda, S. 1601
"The Queen to me a royal pain doth give"
"My bonnie lass she smelleth"

Sources
P.D.Q. Bach: The Stoned Guest

P. D. Q. Bach albums
1970 albums
Works based on the Don Juan legend
Vanguard Records albums
1970s comedy albums